Beth Dagon or Dagan (בית-דגון or בית-דגן) is the name of two biblical cities in Israel.

 A city (Joshua 15:41) in the territory of the tribe of Judah "in the plains", that is, the territory below Jaffa between the Judean hills and the Mediterranean. Its site is uncertain, though it may be adjacent to Latrun. The city was sacked by Sennacherib during the revolt of Sidqa, king of Ashkelon.
Some scholars identify it with the Druze town of Beit Jann.

See also
 Beit Dagan

References

Hebrew Bible cities
Former populated places in Southwest Asia